David Azzi (born January 25, 1981 in Lebanon) was formerly a wide receiver and slotback in the Canadian Football League (CFL).

Football
In 1999 Azzi was named 1st Team All-Canadian, 1st Team All-Academic and earned a full scholarship to attend Div. 1A Bowling Green State University in the NCAA. Azzi played quarterback for under Coach Urban Meyer. Later he transferred  to the University of Ottawa in the CIS.
Azzi was the Ottawa Renegades' first round draft pick in 2004. Azzi won a Grey Cup in 2007 with the Saskatchewan Roughriders. He previously played for the Toronto Argonauts.

References

1981 births
Living people
Bowling Green Falcons football players
Canadian football slotbacks
Canadian people of Lebanese descent
Ottawa Renegades players
Saskatchewan Roughriders players
Toronto Argonauts players
Hillcrest High School (Ottawa) alumni
Sportspeople of Lebanese descent